Karen Gail Miller (née Saxton, born October 14, 1943) is an American businesswoman. After the death of her husband Larry H. Miller, she became chairwoman of the Larry H. Miller Group of Companies, now know as the Larry H. Miller Company. With a net worth of $4 billion she is the wealthiest person in Utah. She held a majority interest in the Utah Jazz, a National Basketball Association (NBA) franchise based in Salt Lake City, Utah, from her husband's death in 2009 until selling the team in 2020. As of 2022, She retained a minority stake.

Business interests
In 2009, when her husband, Larry, died, Gail Miller assumed total ownership of their businesses, the Larry H. Miller Company, which then consisted of 54 car dealerships, a movie theater chain, and the Utah Jazz. As of 2022, most of these assets have been sold and the company has expanded into new businesses such as real estate and healthcare. In November 2020, her estimated net worth was $1.9 billion. As of early 2020, her businesses employed 11,000 people.

Utah Jazz
The Miller family started construction on the Delta Center, which would later become the Vivint Arena, in 1990. It was completed in 1991. The arena has been an economic boon for downtown Salt Lake City. It has attracted large amounts of foot traffic and numerous businesses have been established nearby.

Gail Miller assumed ownership upon her husband's death. In 2017, she transferred ownership of the Utah Jazz and Vivint Arena into a trust to keep the franchise in Utah for generations. The Millers are often credited with saving the team and keeping it in Utah when the franchise was experiencing financial problems in the 1980s.

In 2017, the Miller family spent $125 million renovating the Vivint Arena. The renovations were supervised by Steve Starks.

In 2019, a fan verbally abused NBA player Russell Westbrook. Miller later addressed the home crowd to speak out against the boorish behavior and proclaimed, "This should never happen. We are not a racist community."

In 2020, Jazz player Rudy Gobert donated $200,000 to team employees who were furloughed due to the COVID-19 pandemic. Miller announced that the LHM Group would "more than match" this number.

In October 2020, the Miller family agreed to sell the Jazz and Vivint Arena to Ryan Smith, founder of Qualtrics, for $1.66 billion. This price is about 70 times what the Miller family originally paid. Smith had a long-standing interest in the team. He even sponsored a jersey patch that raised $25 million for charity. Smith made proposals to the Miller family on several occasions before finally reaching acceptable terms. Terms of the deal require the team to remain in Utah and the Miller family will retain a minority interest. The Salt Lake City Stars of the NBA G League and management of the Salt Lake Bees minor league baseball team were also part of the deal. The Miller family said they planned to use the profits from this sale to diversify their businesses and engage in more extensive philanthropy. The Millers rejected previous offers to buy the Jazz.

In the summer of 2022, the Miller family announced that it was selling a portion of its remaining interest in the Utah Jazz. The transaction placed a value of $2.25 billion on the Jazz. The transaction was the result of an agreement made when the Millers sold their majority interest in the team.

Sports & entertainment
Larry H. Miller Sports & Entertainment manages the LHM Group's interests in the Utah Jazz, Salt Lake Bees, Salt Lake City Stars, Megaplex Theaters, Zone Sports Radio network, and other related businesses.

Car dealerships
The Millers acquired and renamed a Toyota dealership in 1979. Miller and her husband built a successful chain of car dealerships. These dealerships produced estimated sales of about $5.4 billion in 2019.

In September 2021, Asbury Automotive announced that it was purchasing LHM Group's car dealerships for about $3.2 billion. This price included $740 million for real estate. The dealerships will retain the LHM branding. Corwin Auto Group of North Dakota purchased LHM Liberty Toyota and the LHM Toyota dealership in Boulder, Colorado.

While under the ownership of the Miller family, their car dealerships started an annual food drive to benefit local food banks.

Health care
In January 2021, the LHM Group announced its purchase of Advanced Health Care (AHC), a chain of high-end nursing homes and hospices that also provides in-home health care. AHC patients are generally transitioning from in-hospital acute care to living at home. The purchase price was undisclosed. The LHM Group said the acquisition was part of a broader effort to diversify their portfolio of businesses. AHC was founded in Idaho in 2001 and runs 22 facilities, including six in Utah. The other facilities are in Arizona, California, Colorado, Idaho, Kansas, Nevada, and New Mexico. AHC was founded roughly 20 years before its acquisition by LHM Group. The deal was finalized after two years of negotiations. This was LHM Group's first acquisition in health care.

The facility formerly known as the Harmony Hills Assisted Living Center in Lehi, Utah was purchased by AHC in 2022. As of early 2023, the facility was undergoing renovations and was scheduled to re-open in May 2023. The renovation includes a large salt-water fish tank, a new gym, a new hair salon, and a new library. The facility will be renamed the Aspen Ridge Residences. It will be AHC's first assisted living center. Studio and one-bedroom apartments will be on offer.

AHC was founded by Lehi-native Brett Nattress, a general authority for the Church of Jesus Christ of Latter-day Saints.

Real estate
In 2021, the LHM Group's real estate subsidiary acquired the remaining 1,300 acres undeveloped of land and numerous buildings in Daybreak, a mixed-use development in South Jordan in Salt Lake County. It was acquired from Varde Partners. The LHM Group plans to build approximately 6,000 additional homes in Daybreak.

In early 2022, LHM Group announced that its real estate division had acquired builder Destination Homes. LHM planned to retain the Destination Homes name and its staff.

In March 2022, it was reported that LLCs controilled by Larry H. Miller Real Estate had purchased 950 acres in Richardson Flat in unincorporated Summit County.

Recyclops
On June 17, 2022, Larry H. Miller Company announced that it was investing an undisclosed sum in Recyclops, a Utah start-up company that recycles materials such as polystyrene, film, batteries, lightbulbs, and textiles that are difficult to handle and serves often neglected rural areas. Recyclops operates on a subscription model. Recyclops was founded in 2014. As of 2022, it operated in 18 states.

In mid-2022, Recylops expanded service in Kentucky to Bowling Green and Warren County.

Philanthropy

In 2000, Brigham Young University announced that the Millers had made a significant financial contribution towards the new 4,000-seat, $7 million baseball and softball complex. Built on campus, the project was named Miller Park and the softball field was christened Gail Miller Field and the baseball field is called Larry H. Miller Field.

Starting in 2002, the Miller family has supported the Larry H. and Gail Miller Enrichment Scholarship. As of 2022, this supported has totaled roughly $13 million.

In 2007, Miller and her husband established the Larry H. & Gail Miller Family Foundation.

In 2013, Miller partnered with former Utah Governor Mike Leavitt and former First Lady Norma Matheson to create "Count My Vote," a bipartisan effort to push for state electoral reform.

In December 2021, Larry H. Miller Charities donated $30,000 to Christmas for Kids initiative by the Jordan Education Foundation.
Miller donated $50 million to Intermountain Healthcare (IHC), a non-profit group of hospitals and clinics that serves children in Utah, Wyoming, Montana, Idaho, Nevada, and Alaska. This donation was the start of a $500 million fundraising campaign. Miller has served as a member of IHC's board of trustees since 2013 and its chair since 2018. She has since resigned as chair

In 2019, it was reported that Miller had set up a process for young members of her family, starting at the age of 12, to participate in philanthropy. They may select registered non-profit organizations and then prepare proposals to support them for submission to the board of the family foundation.

In 2019, the Gail Miller Resource Center, dedicated to helping the homeless, opened in Salt Lake City.

In late 2020, Miller decided to sell her late husband's coin collection, worth about $25 million, and donate the proceeds to IHC. The donation will be used to build a second campus for the Primary Children's Hospital in Lehi.

In 2021, Miller made a $10 million donation to Shelter the Homeless through her charitable foundation. Shelter the Homeless runs three resource centers for homeless people in Salt Lake City.

As of 2022, Miller continued her husband's financial support of the Joseph Smith Papers.

Miller supported a state law in Utah to provide menstruation products to students free of charge. She donated $50,000 to SisterGoods, a group working on this issue. In early 2022, the Miller family foundation agreed to fund the distribution of period products in public schools, in partnership with the Andrus Family Foundation.

Miller donated $500,000 to create centers to help homeless students in public schools.

Miller's foundation and other organizations such as the Huntsman Family Foundation and  Zions Bank, donated $2 million to the Utah Community Foundation to support victim's of Russia's invasion of Ukraine in 2022. Retail locations controlled by LHM Group accepted in-kind donations.

In March 2022, the Miller donated $2.1 million from her foundation to Southern Utah University (SUU) to support its Entrepreneurship Center. This donation was a matching grant. The foundation has donated a total of $3.6 million to the Entrepreneurship Program.

Through her family foundation, Miller donated $5 million for the renovation of a softball facility at Big Cottonwood Regional Park which has since been renamed the Larry H. Miller Softball Complex.

In 2022, through her foundation, Miller donated $3.5 million to open the Miller Advanced Research and Solutions Center (MARS). MARS is a center at Weber State University that conducts research related to national defense with student participation. It is located near Hill Air Force Base. The new Missile and Energy Research Center is located in the same building as MARS.

In 2022, Miller donated $5 million to the Utah Housing Preservation Fund to preserve older housing and affordable housing to renovate for future tenants.

Miller sits on the board of Shelter the Homeless.

Miller sits on the board of trustees as an emeritus member at Salt Lake Community College.

In 2022, Gail Miller and her family foundation donated $10 million to Salt Lake City Community College. The donation will be used to improve the building where the business school resides, which is now known as The Larry H. & Gail Miller Family Business Building. The business school is now known as the Gail Miller School of Business.

For Thanksgiving in 2022, The Larry H. and Gail Miller Family Foundation, the Larry H. Miller Company, and local governments worked together with non-profits to provide about 3,000 meals and many other services at the Salt Palace Convention Center. This was the 24th-straight year the Miller family has helped to provide Thanksgiving meals to the homeless and those experiencing food insecurity. In addition, participants were given vaccinations for the flu and COVID-19, diabetes testing, free feminine hygiene products, dental cleanings, clothes, legal help, free public transit passes, and free bicycle repairs.

Through her family foundation, Miller created the Larry H. and Gail Miller Enrichment Scholarship for college students.

Personal life
Miller was born in Sandy, Utah, on October 14, 1943.

She and Larry Miller, whom she married on March 25, 1965, are the parents of five children. Miller married Kim Wilson in 2012. Miller is a member of the Church of Jesus Christ of Latter-day Saints.

Recognition
In 2012, Miller was recognized with the ATHENA International Award. The award is sponsored by Wells Fargo and presented by the Salt Lake Chamber.

In 2015, Miller received the Giant in our City award. This award is generally regarded as the most prestigious business award in Utah. It is presented by the Salt Lake Chamber.

In 2017, miller received an honorary doctorate from the University of Utah.

In 2019, the Joint Leadership Commission of the Congressional Award Foundation and its board of directors presented Miller the Horizon Award in a ceremony on Capitol Hill in Washington, D.C. recognizing her work in the community and with young people.

In 2019, Miller was named "Utahn of the Year" by The Salt Lake Tribune.

In early 2020, Miller was one of the recipients recognized via Ford's Salute to Dealers awards. The award was given in recognition of Miller's community service and philanthropy. Ford specifically mentioned the LHM Group's Larry H. Miller Day of Service that helps employees donating thousands of hours to helping the homeless, at-risk youth, families of severely ill children, and victims of domestic abuse.

Politics
In 2020, Miller, along with many other business leaders, endorsed the Republican gubernatorial campaign of Spencer Cox.

Corporate boards
Miller serves on the advisory board of directors at Zions Bancorporation.

References

1943 births
Living people
American billionaires
Businesspeople from Salt Lake City
American Latter Day Saints
American philanthropists
American mass media owners
Female billionaires
Utah Jazz personnel
People from Sandy, Utah